The North Olmsted City School District is the public school district that serves the city of  North Olmsted, Ohio, United States.  As of 2005, 4,573 students attended its nine schools. The North Olmsted City School  colors are orange and black.  The mascot is the Eagle.  The school's fight songs are Miami U (from the University of Miami, Florida), On Wisconsin and War Eagle from Auburn University.

Awards and Reportcard 
 
The School District passed a levy on February 6, 2007, the fifth attempt after four previous failures. 4,077 votes were cast for the Levy and 3,383 votes were cast against the Levy. 

Despite levy problems, North Olmsted High School continues to be awarded "Excellent" status on its school report card meeting 12 out of 12 state indicators for the 2006–2007 school year, as well as 2005–2006, 2004–2005, and 2003–2004.

Birch, Butternut, Forest and Spruce elementary schools also earned "Excellent" status for the 2006–2007 school year.  Chestnut, Maple, Pine and the North Olmsted Middle School earned "Effective" status for the 2006–2007 school year.

Schools
The school district administers a number of schools.

North Olmsted High School is the city's sole high school, and consists of grades 9 through 12.  Enrollment for the 2007–2008 school year was approximately 1,600.

North Olmsted Middle School  is the city's sole middle school and consists of grades 7 through 8. In 2015, the middle school relocated to Korab Hall, a building leased from St. Richard Catholic Church in preparation for the demolition of the old middle school buildings in advance of the construction of a $90 million combined middle school and high school. The building had previously been used by St. Richard School, which had closed two years earlier for financial reasons. The new campus is scheduled to open for the 2018–2019 school year.

Elementary education is provided by a combination of primary schools, which cover kindergarten and grades 1 through 3; and intermediate schools, which cover grades 4 though 6. The schools all have tree-themed names. The primary schools are Birch, Forest and Spruce Primary Schools, and the intermediate schools are Chestnut, Maple and Pine Intermediate Schools.

A former primary school, Butternut, was closed in 2016 and converted into administrative offices and a bus transportation center.

District alumni

The following notable individuals attended North Olmsted City Schools:
 Thom Hatch, author and historian
 Jim Tocco, baseball broadcaster
 Adam Russell, Pitcher for the Tampa Bay Rays (MLB)

See also
 List of school districts in Ohio

External links
 North Olmsted City School District

References 

School districts in Cuyahoga County, Ohio